The high-finned dragonet (Synchiropus rameus) is a species of dragonet native to the Pacific Ocean off the coasts of northwestern Australia as well as New Caledonia, where it favors substrates consisting of sand or rubble and reaches a length of  TL.

References

high-finned dragonnet
Fish of New Caledonia
Marine fish of Western Australia
Taxa named by Allan Riverstone McCulloch
high-finned dragonet